"This Is What It Feels Like" is a song by Dutch DJ and record producer Armin van Buuren, featuring Canadian singer, songwriter and former soulDecision frontman Trevor Guthrie, released in the Netherlands by Armada Music on 1 January 2013 as the second single from van Buuren's fifth studio album, Intense (2013).

"This Is What It Feels Like" peaked at number three on the Dutch Top 40. Outside the Netherlands, "This Is What It Feels Like" peaked within the top ten of the charts in ten countries, including Austria, Belgium (Flanders), Canada, Israel and the United Kingdom.

The song was written by Armin van Buuren, Benno de Goeij, Jenson Vaughan, Trevor Guthrie and John Ewbank. Van Buuren wrote the instrumental with de Goeij and Ewbank in 2012. Trevor Guthrie wrote the lyrics with Jenson Vaughan, and it was inspired by Guthrie's neighbour who was diagnosed with a brain tumor. "This Is What It Feels Like" was nominated for the 2014 Grammy Award for Best Dance Recording. The song was featured in the intro for a 2019 episode of America's Got Talent.

Music video
A music video to accompany the release of "This is What It Feels Like" was first released on YouTube on 17 March 2013. The video also features a guest appearance by Ron Jeremy. As of September 2017, it has received over 100 million views, making it the fifth most-viewed video on Armada Music's YouTube channel.

Track listing
 Digital downloads
 "This Is What It Feels Like" – 3:25
 "This Is What It Feels Like" (extended mix) – 5:16
 "This Is What It Feels Like" (W&W remix) – 6:16
 "This Is What It Feels Like" (David Guetta remix) – 5:28
 "This Is What It Feels Like" (Antillas and Dankann remix) – 5:44
 "This Is What It Feels Like" (Antillas and Dankann radio edit) – 3:34
 "This Is What It Feels Like" (Giuseppe Ottaviani remix) – 6:38
 "This Is What It Feels Like" (Giuseppe Ottaviani radio edit) – 3:55
 "This Is What It Feels Like" (John Ewbank classical remix) – 3:12
 UK CD single
 "This Is What It Feels Like" – 3:25
 "This Is What It Feels Like" (extended mix) – 5:16
 "This Is What It Feels Like" (W&W remix) – 6:16
 "Waiting for the Night" – 3:03
 German CD single
 "This Is What It Feels Like" – 3:25
 "This Is What It Feels Like" (David Guetta remix) – 5:28

 Maddix remix
 "This Is What It Feels Like" (Maddix remix) – 3:50
 "This Is What It Feels Like" (Maddix extended mix) – 4:50

Charts

Weekly charts

Year-end charts

Certifications

Release history

Jason Benoit version

"This Is What It Feels Like" was covered by Canadian country music artist Jason Benoit and released through Sky Hit Records, under license to Sony Music Canada, as Benoit's debut single on 10 September 2013. His rendition reached number 46 on the Billboard Canada Country chart. It received positive reviews for Benoit's "strong vocal performance" was also included on the compilation album, Country Heat 2014.

Music video
An official lyric video was uploaded to Benoit's Vevo channel on 4 October 2013.

Chart performance

References

2013 singles
2013 songs
Armin van Buuren songs
Armada Music singles
Juno Award for Dance Recording of the Year recordings
Songs written by Armin van Buuren
Songs written by Benno de Goeij
Songs written by Jenson Vaughan
Songs written by Trevor Guthrie
Trevor Guthrie songs
Jason Benoit songs